Watson Valley is a valley east of Mount Lewis in the Saint Johns Range of Victoria Land. The valley, which opens southward to Victoria Upper Glacier, is ice free except for a small glacier at the head wall. It was named by the Advisory Committee on Antarctic Names in 2007 after HM2 Donald E. Watson, U.S. Navy (Seabees), who at the time was Medical Assistant and member of the construction crew which built the original Little America V Station and the original Byrd Station in the 1955-57 pre-IGY period. He was the medical person on the oversnow Byrd Traverse to Byrd Station, 1956.

References

Valleys of Victoria Land